Muha is a commune of Bujumbura Mairie Province in Burundi.

See also 

 Communes of Burundi

References 

Communes of Burundi
Bujumbura Province